The 2012–13 FC Hansa Rostock season is the 67th season in the club's football history. In 2012–13 the club plays in the 3. Liga; the third tier of German football. It is the club's first season in this league after relegation from the 2. Bundesliga in 2012. The club was eliminated in the first round of the DFB-Pokal and are currently in the Mecklenburg-Vorpommern Cup.

Review and events

The 2012–13 FC Hansa Rostock season began on 21 July 2012 with a 2–1 victory against Stuttgarter Kickers. The club also took part in the DFB-Pokal of the DFB-Pokal, and was knocked out in the first round by 1. FC Kaiserslautern. The club also takes part in the 2012–13 edition of the Mecklenburg-Vorpommern Cup, having reached the third round.

After an average start to the season, with nine points out of eight matches and a 14th place in the table the club dismissed coach Wolfgang Wolf on 3 September and replaced him with Marc Fascher two days later.

Fixtures and results

Legend

3. Liga

League results and fixtures

Table

Results summary

DFB-Pokal

Mecklenburg-Vorpommern Cup

Squad and statistics

|-
! colspan="12" style="background:#dcdcdc; text-align:center"| Goalkeepers

|-
! colspan="12" style="background:#dcdcdc; text-align:center"| Defenders

|-
! colspan="12" style="background:#dcdcdc; text-align:center"| Midfielders

|-
! colspan="12" style="background:#dcdcdc; text-align:center"| Forwards

|}

References

Match reports

Other sources

External links
 2012–13 FC Hansa Rostock season at Weltfussball.de 
 2012–13 FC Hansa Rostock season at kicker.de 
 2012–13 FC Hansa Rostock season at Fussballdaten.de 

Hansa Rostock
FC Hansa Rostock seasons